Daniel Hugh Kelly (born August 10, 1952) is an American stage, film and television actor. He is best known for his role on the 1980s ABC TV series Hardcastle and McCormick (1983–86) as the ex-con Mark "Skid" McCormick, co-starring with actor Brian Keith.

Early life
The middle of five children, Kelly was born and raised in Elizabeth, New Jersey, where his grandfather and father were police officers/detectives and his mother was a social worker. He attended and graduated from Roselle Catholic High School in 1970. A graduate of St. Vincent College (Latrobe, Pennsylvania) in 1974, he pursued a Master of Fine Arts (MFA) at Catholic University (Washington, D.C.) on a full scholarship.

Career
Kelly appeared in numerous Off-Broadway and Off-Off-Broadway productions, primarily at The Public Theater and Second Stage Theatre. A product of regional repertory theater, Kelly has been a company member of the Williamstown Theater Festival (Massachusetts), the Folger Theater (DC), Arena Stage (DC), and the Actors Theatre of Louisville among others.

He toured with the National Players, the oldest classical touring company in the United States. He starred on Broadway opposite Madeline Kahn's Billie in Born Yesterday in 1989, and as Brick opposite Kathleen Turner's Maggie in Cat on a Hot Tin Roof in 1990. In 2003, he appeared at the Mark Taper Forum (Los Angeles), originating the role of Richard in Living Out by Lisa Loomer.

Kelly starred on daytime TV in Ryan's Hope as Senator Frank Ryan (1978–1981). Aside from Hardcastle and McCormick, he has starred in such television series as Chicago Story; I Married Dora, Second Noah, Ponderosa and Walt Disney Presents The 100 Lives of Blackjack Savage (1991) which he also co-produced. He returned to daytime television on As the World Turns, playing Col. Winston Mayer (2007–2009). He guest-starred in some television series, such as Law & Order, Law & Order: Special Victims Unit, Law & Order: Los Angeles, Memphis Beat, The West Wing, NCIS: Los Angeles, Supernatural, Major Crimes, Boston Legal, Las Vegas and Walker, Texas Ranger.

He also appeared in miniseries and television movies, such as Passing Glory, The Tuskegee Airmen, Citizen Cohn, From the Earth to the Moon and The Nutcracker, among others. His feature film roles include the 1983 horror film Cujo, The Good Son, The In Crowd, Chill Factor, Nowhere to Hide, Bad Company, Someone to Watch Over Me, and Star Trek: Insurrection.

Stage
Broadway
 Born Yesterday – Richard Rodgers Theater (1989)
 Cat on a Hot Tin Roof – Eugene O'Neill Theatre (1990)

Off-Broadway
 Miss Margarida's Way – Public Theater (1977)
 The Hunchback of Notre Dame – Public Theater (1977)
 Fishing – Second Stage Theatre (1981)
 Juno's Swans Second Stage Theatre (1985)

Regional
 Henry IV Part 1 – National Players (1974)
 Charley's Aunt – National Players (1974)
 School for Wives – National Players (1974)
 An Enemy of the People – Arena Stage (1975)
 Once in a Lifetime – Arena Stage (1975)
 A Bird in the Hand – The Wayside Theater (1975)
 No Time for Sergeants – The Wayside Theater (1975)
 Of Mice and Men – Cohoes Music Hall (1976)
 The Best Man – Actors Theatre of Louisville (1976)
 Much Ado About Nothing – Actors Theatre of Louisville (1976)
 A Christmas Carol – Actors Theatre of Louisville (1976)
 Arturo Ui – Actors Theatre of Louisville (1977)
 The Rainmaker – Actors Theatre of Louisville (1977)
 Tennessee Williams: A Celebration – Williamstown Theatre Festival (1982)
 Room Service Williamstown Theatre Festival (1982)
 Enemies – Williamstown Theatre Festival (1982)
 Barbarians – Williamstown Theatre Festival (1986)
 Hawthorne Country – Williamstown Theatre Festival (1986)
 The Lucky Spot – Williamstown Theatre Festival (1986)
 Living Out – Mark Taper Forum (2003)
 The Art of Losing – Blank Theatre Company (2012)

Filmography

References

External links
 
 
 
 
 

1952 births
American male film actors
American male soap opera actors
American male stage actors
American male television actors
Living people
Actors from Elizabeth, New Jersey
Male actors from New Jersey
Male actors from New York (state)
Saint Vincent College alumni
Catholic University of America alumni
Roselle Catholic High School alumni